Marvin Barkis (born January 22, 1943) is an American politician who served in the Kansas House of Representatives from the 6th district from 1979 to 1993. He served as Speaker of the Kansas House of Representatives from 1991 to 1993.

References

External links
 Marvin Barkis Papers
 Kansas Oral History Project - Marvin Barkis

1943 births
Living people
Speakers of the Kansas House of Representatives
Democratic Party members of the Kansas House of Representatives
University of Ottawa alumni
Stanford University alumni
20th-century American politicians